Jumbo Love is a long  sport climbing route on remote limestone cliffs on Clark Mountain in the Mojave Desert. Bolted by American climber Randy Leavitt in the 1990s, he invited Chris Sharma to attempt it in 2007.

The route has been repeated, and its grade confirmed, by a number of subsequent climbers, including French climber Seb Bouin, who made the fourth ascent on October 25, 2022.  Bouin followed up his ascent by adding a direct start to the route on November 1, 2022, to create a route called Suprême Jumbo Love, which at  became North America's hardest climbing route and only the sixth 9b+ sport climbing route in history.

History 
The original route was bolted by American climber Randy Leavitt in the late 1990s, who envisaged it being a 3-pitch climb. Leavitt failed to complete the route and invited Chris Sharma to try it. In 2008, Pringle was injured and Sharma, living below the cliff for weeks, made the first ascent on September 11, 2008. Sharma named the route Jumbo Love in recognition of Leavitt's neighboring route, Jumbo Pumping Hate.

Fred Rouhling's controversial 1995 route, was downgraded to 9a in 2020. Bernabe Fernandez's equally controversial 2003 route, was downgraded to 9a+/b. Finally, 's 2007 route, Ali Hulk Sit Start Extension, was later downgraded to 9a+/b, with the use of kneebars.

Rouhling, Fernandez, Andrada, and Caldwell, would never climb another route with a claim of being at a grade of 9b (or above).

The first repeat of Jumbo Love was completed almost seven years later by Ethan Pringle on May 17, 2015; his climb (and Sharma's 2008 ascent) was captured in the 2016 Reel Rock documentary film Reel Rock: Jumbo Love. American climber Jonathan Siegrist completed the third ascent on May 17, 2018, and French climber Seb Bouin made the fourth ascent on October 25, 2022. Despite being able to use kneepads, Bouin felt the 9b grade was unaffected, saying: "Jumbo Love is not just a hard line, it's a whole adventure"; Bouin had then climbed 9b/9b+, 9b+ and 9c.

Suprême Jumbo Love 
From 2010 to 2013, Sharma tried to add a direct start to Jumbo Love but ended up eventually abandoning the project; Leavitt told Climbing that the direct start could create a new route that was closer to grade . After completing the fourth ascent of Jumbo Love, Seb Bouin immediately began working on the direct start, which he named Suprême Jumbo Love. Suprême Jumbo Love was the first-ever 9b+ in North America, and the sixth 9b+ in history. Leavitt was present at Bouin's ascent.

Legacy
In the 2016 Reel Rock documentary on Jumbo Love, the first ascent was described as a "watershed moment" in sport climbing; Pringle expressed his own deflation at not being able to make the first ascent and noted that "when Chris ascended Jumbo Love, it really elevated his rock-star status". When Seb Bouin made the fourth ascent in 2022, he said: "This king line has attracted me for a long time. It was a true inspiration to see the footage of Chris Sharma on it. I started climbing around 2005 and it was one of the most incredible climbing films I had watched at that time".

Sharma said that after Jumbo Love he had to change his approach.  His past breakthroughs had been on routes established and bolted by other climbers who had given up on them. In a 2013 interview with Rock & Ice he said: "I wanted to push myself to the next level. Where is that? I had to discover it. That was a big process in itself. So I bolted all these routes [in Spain]. And a lot of them ended up being that next level". The culmination of that process would be Sharma and Adam Ondra's development and completion of La Dura Dura, the world's first-ever  in 2013.

Ascents 
Jumbo Love has been ascended by:
 1st Chris Sharma, September 11, 2008
 2nd Ethan Pringle, May 17, 2015
 3rd Jonathan Siegrist, May 17, 2018
 4th Seb Bouin, October 25, 2022

Suprême Jumbo Love has been ascended by:
 1st Seb Bouin, November 1, 2022

Filmography
 Includes Chris Sharma's 2008 ascent: 
 Ethan Pringle's 2015 repeat:

See also 

 History of rock climbing
 List of first ascents (sport climbing)
 Silence, first climb in the world with a potential grade of 
 La Dura Dura, second climb in the world to be graded 
 Realization/Biographie, first climb in the world with a consensus grade of 
 Action Directe, first climb in the world with a consensus grade of 
 Hubble, first climb in the world with a consensus grade of

References

External links
The Story of Jumbo Love, Hard Climbs (2022)
VIDEO: Watch Ethan Pringle's Full 35-Minute Send of Jumbo Love (5.15b), Climbing (May 2017)
VIDEO: Jumbo Love, Reel Rock (Season 2, Episode 10) (documentary on Sharma's first ascent, and Pringle's second ascent, of Jumbo Love)

Climbing routes
2008 in sport climbing
2022 in sport climbing
Sport climbing